Norton Canes Stadium was a former greyhound racing track situated in Norton Canes, near Cannock in Staffordshire.

Origins

Charles Southall built the track in 1974 and chose a site east of the village of Norton Canes on the west side of the Brownhills Road. The track was dwarfed by the large Chasewater reservoir on its eastern side.

Opening
Racing began under the N.G.R.C permit scheme in 1975 and races were run over the distances of 265m, 440m, 617m, 792m and 969m. Facilities included a licensed club house and there was a car park for 400 vehicles, kennels for 75 greyhounds and a glass fronted
covered stand.

History
The management introduced two competitions called the Norton Canes Derby and the Champion Bitch Stakes. Stephen Rea took over the lease in 1980 at a time when a rival track the Chasewater Raceway opened. In 1984 Rea sold the lease to John Preece a businessman with an engineering firm in Stourbridge. The track enjoyed a popular spell with Preece as a promoter, the attendances went up and it attracted one of the sports leading trainers Geoff De Mulder.

DeMulder trained Fearless Ace when he won the Pall Mall Stakes in 1988 and in 1992 Glideaway Silver won the Scottish Greyhound Derby; The white and fawn dog was trained by Michael Compton. English Greyhound Derby final appearances followed for Cooladine Style in 1989 and Fair Hill Boy and Galtymore Lad in 1990.

Other trainers included Norman Johnson, Sylvia Houlker, Melvin Baker, Russ Kinsey, Maurice Buckland and George Lightfoot and Harry Dodds trained 
Appleby Lisa who became the Gold Collar champion in 1991. Derek Pugh brought the Irish sales to Norton Canes for a short spell in the early nineties after selling Cradley Heath Stadium.

Closure
Norton Canes came to an abrupt end on 31 July 1995 when Preece pulled out as promoter after struggling to keep the track profitable. The track then suffered a serious fire in March 1996 effectively ending any chance of sport returning to the site.

Derelict
As of 2012 the site was still derelict awaiting planning permission for a housing development.

Norton Canes Derby

Track records

References

Defunct greyhound racing venues in the United Kingdom
Defunct sports venues in Staffordshire